Emotion In Motion is Israeli psychedelic trance duo Ananda Shake's first album  released on January 27, 2005.

Track listing
"Old School" – 7:37
"Wrong Answer" – 7:55
"Let The Music" – 7:38
"Wonderland" (Album Version) – 8:46
"Caution!" – 7:19
"Banana Banji" – 7:34
"Break Dance" – 8:19
"Make Me Shake" – 6:49
"Total Madness" – 7:14
"Emotion In Motion" – 7:42

References

External links
 Emotion in Motion on Discogs

2005 albums
Ananda Shake albums